Clanculus cruciatus is a species of sea snail, a marine gastropod mollusk in the family Trochidae, the top snails.

Description
The size of the shell varies between 6 mm and 10 mm. The narrowly umbilicate shell has a globose-conic shape with a conic spire and an acute apex. It is pinkish, dark brown, blackish or pink, radiately maculated with white below the sutures, and dotted with white around the center of the base. The 5 to 6 whorls are convex and separated by canaliculate sutures, and spirally granose-lirate. The body whorl is rounded, and encircled by about 13 lirae. Those above the periphery are granulose, about as wide as the interstices, those beneath more separated and smoother. The interstices are finely spirally striate. The base of the shell is convex. The oblique aperture is subcircular. The outer and basal lips are rounded and finely crenulate within. The columella is slightly concave, bearing a small denticle at its base and above near the insertion. The parietal wall is nearly smooth. The deep umbilicus is narrow, smooth, and white within. It is bordered by a strong smooth or obsoletely crenulated marginal rib, and surrounded by narrow tract of white.

Distribution
This species occurs in the Mediterranean Sea.

References

 Risso A., 1826–1827: Histoire naturelle des principales productions de l'Europe Méridionale et particulièrement de celles des environs de Nice et des Alpes Maritimes; Paris, Levrault, Vol. 1: XII + 448 + 1 carta [1826]. Vol. 2: VII + 482 + 8 pl. (fiori) [novembre 1827]. Vol. 3: XVI + 480 + 14 pl. (pesci) [septembre 1827]. Vol. 4: IV + 439 + 12 pl. (molluschi) [novembre 1826]. Vol. 5: VIII + 400 + 10 pl. (altri invertebrati)
 Payraudeau B. C., 1826: Catalogue descriptif et méthodique des Annelides et des Mollusques de l'île de Corse; Paris pp. 218 + 8 pl
 Wood W., 1828: Supplement to the Index Testaceologicus or a catalogue of shells, British and foreign; London, privately published pp. VI + 59 + 8 pl
 Aradas A. & Benoit L., 1872–1876: Conchigliologia vivente marina della Sicilia; Atti dell'Accademia Gioenia di Scienze Naturali (3) 6: 1–113 + pl. 1-2 [1872]; 113–226 + pl. 3-4 [1874]; 227–324 + pl. 5 [1876] 
 Monterosato T. A. (di), 1880: Notizie intorno ad alcune conchiglie delle coste d'Africa; Bullettino della Società Malacologica Italiana, Pisa 5: 213–233. (1879)
 Bucquoy E., Dautzenberg P. & Dollfus G., 1882–1886: Les mollusques marins du Roussillon. Tome Ier. Gastropodes.; Paris, J.B. Baillière & fils
 Pallary P., 1900: Coquilles marines du littoral du Départment d'Oran; Journal de Conchyliologie 48 (3): 211–422, pl. 6-8
 Gofas, S.; Le Renard, J.; Bouchet, P. (2001). Mollusca, in: Costello, M.J. et al. (Ed.) (2001). European register of marine species: a check-list of the marine species in Europe and a bibliography of guides to their identification. Collection Patrimoines Naturels, 50: pp. 180–213

External links
 

cruciatus
Gastropods described in 1758
Taxa named by Carl Linnaeus